The Yudo π3 or Yudo Pi3 is a subcompact crossover SUV produced by the Chinese NEV manufacturer Yudo Auto.

Overview

The Yudo π3 was launched on the Chinese car market in 2019. Initial price ranges from 179,800 to 192,800 yuan.

The Yudo π3 was powered by a single front positioned motor producing 90kW and 270Nm motor. The battery of the Yudo π3 is a 51kWh lithium-ion battery capable of a 401km range for 2019.

References 

Compact sport utility vehicles
Subcompact cars
Crossover sport utility vehicles
Cars of China
Cars introduced in 2019
Production electric cars